Iyad Makhlouf  (born 21 January 1973), also known as Eyad Makhlouf, is a major in the Syrian General Intelligence Directorate, a brother of Syrian businessman Rami Makhlouf and maternal cousin of Syrian President Bashar al-Assad. 

He is sanctioned by the European Union, US Treasury, and UK Treasury for violence against the civilian population during the Syrian uprisings, and for helping Rami Makhlouf or the Syrian government evade sanctions.

References 

Living people
1973 births
Assad family
 People named in the Panama Papers
Syrian individuals subject to U.S. Department of the Treasury sanctions
Syrian individuals subject to the European Union sanctions
Syrian individuals subject to United Kingdom sanctions
Sanctioned due to Syrian civil war